ENH or enh may refer to:

 Evanston Northwestern Healthcare, former name of an integrated healthcare delivery system in Illinois, US
 Enshi Xujiaping Airport (IATA code), China
 Tundra Enets language (ISO 639-3 code: enh)
 Enhanced, a convective outlook of the Storm Prediction Center
 The national hydrocarbon company of Mozambique, Empresa Nacional de Hidrocarbonetos

See also
 Enhance (disambiguation)